K. Boom F.C. (Koninklijke Boom Football Club) was a Belgian football club founded as Rupel FC Boom in 1908 in Boom, near Antwerp. It changed its name in 1913 to Boom Football Club. It received the matricule n°58.

It last played in the Belgian First Division in the 1992/1993 season.

Due to financial, sporting and home ground difficulties, the club merged with neighbours S.K. Rupel in 1998 to form K Rupel Boom FC (matricule n°2138) and the matricule n°58 was subsequently erased.

Honours
Belgian Second Division:
Winners (2): 1938, 1977
Promotion (1): 1992
Belgian Third Division
Champions (2): 1963, 1971
Promotion (2): 1926, 1931

References

 
Association football clubs established in 1908
Association football clubs disestablished in 1998
Organisations based in Belgium with royal patronage
1908 establishments in Belgium
1998 disestablishments in Belgium
K. Boom F.C.
Belgian Pro League clubs
Defunct football clubs in Belgium